The Palm Beach Punishers are a football team in the Women's Football Alliance based in Palm Beach County, Florida.  Home games are played on the campus of Palm Beach Central High School in nearby Wellington. The team's name and logo are a reference to comic book character The Punisher, who resided in Palm Beach in the 2004 film of the same name (in the comic series, The Punisher lives in New York City).

From their inaugural season in 2007 until 2010, the Punishers played in the Independent Women's Football League.

Season-by-season

|-
| colspan="6" align="center" | Palm Beach Punishers (IWFL)
|-
|2007 || 1 || 7 || 0 || 4th East South Atlantic || --
|-
|2008 || 0 || 8 || 0 || 4th Tier II East South Atlantic || --
|-
|2009 || 2 || 6 || 0 || 11th Tier II || --
|-
|2010 || 1 || 7 || 0 || 5th Tier II East Southeast || --
|-
| colspan="6" align="center" | Palm Beach Punishers (WFA)
|-
|2011 || 5 || 3 || 0 || 2nd National Coastal || --
|-
|2012* || -- || -- || -- || -- || --
|-
!Totals || 9 || 31 || 0
|colspan="2"| 

* = Current standing

2009

Season schedule

2010

Season schedule

2011

Standings

Season schedule

2012

Season schedule

2013

2014

External links
 Palm Beach Punishers official website
 WFA official website

Women's Football Alliance teams
Sports in Palm Beach County, Florida
American football teams in Florida
American football teams established in 2007
Sports in the Miami metropolitan area
2007 establishments in Florida
Women in Florida